Rachel Neeson is an Australian architect and lecturer in architecture. Her architecture practice Neeson Murcutt Architects, formed with her late partner Nick Murcutt in 2004, was awarded the Australian Institute of Architects Robin Boyd Award for Residential Architecture – Houses in 2011.

Life 
Neeson studied architecture at the University of Sydney and graduated with the University Medal in 1993. She was awarded the Board of Architects 2002 Byera Hadley Travelling Scholarship and completed a master's degree in architecture in Barcelona, Spain.

Neeson Murcutt Architects won the Australian Institute of Architects' New South Wales Wilkinson Award in 2007 and in 2009, and the Robin Boyd Award in 2011. Some of the practice's most notable projects have been the redesign of The Prince Alfred Pool and the Juanita Nielsen Community Centre, both in Sydney.

Neeson lectures in architecture at the University of Sydney.

References

Living people
Architects from Sydney
University of Sydney alumni
Academic staff of the University of Sydney
Year of birth missing (living people)